Leucanopsis setosa is a moth of the family Erebidae. It was described by Walter Rothschild in 1909. It is found in Peru.

References

setosa
Moths described in 1909